The men's 500 meter at the 2019 KNSB Dutch Single Distance Championships took place in Heerenveen at the Thialf ice skating rink on Friday 28 December 2018. There were 22 participants.

Statistics

Result

Source:

Scheidsrechter: D. Melis. Assistant: F. Zwitser  Starter: J. Smegen 
Start: 18:20 hr. Finish: 18:44 hr

Draw

References

Single Distance Championships
2019 Single Distance